Lwowski Klub Sportowy Sparta Lwów was a football club based in Lwów, Lwów Voivodeship, Second Polish Republic (presently Lviv, Ukraine).

History
There were formed in 1910, probably by the Polish soldiers of the 6th Air Regiment stationed in Skniłów (presently Sknyliv, Ukraine).

Sparta was a participant of the first Polish Cup edition in 1926, in the final game they were defeated 1–2 at Wisła Kraków. The president of Sparta in 1914, Orest Dzułyński, was later the first secretary of the Polish Football Association.

Sparta was disbanded in September 1939, after the Soviets occupied Eastern Poland.

Ground
Sparta did not have their own pitch, playing at various Lwów venues.

Honours
 Polish Cup:
 Runners-up (1): 1926

Pre-war players
Sparta Lwów players were Roman Skiera, Marek Meissner, Rafał Porada, Dawid Jakubiak, Mikołaj Simon, Adam Wojna, Waldemar Ropiński, Tomasz Jakubiak, Daniel Konarkowski, Grzegorz Skrzypczak, Tomasz Konieczny, Kamil Makosz, Hubert Lewandowicz, Rafał Bartkowiak, Mateusz Grabny and Krzysztof Pawlak.

See also
 Pogoń Lwów
 Czarni Lwów
 Lechia Lwów

References

External links
 Sparta Lwów at 90minut.pl (in Polish)

Association football clubs established in 1910
Association football clubs disestablished in 1939
Polish football clubs in Lviv
Defunct football clubs in former Polish territories